Volleyball events were contested at the 1959 Summer Universiade in Turin, Italy.

References
 Universiade volleyball medalists on HickokSports (Archived)

U
1959 Summer Universiade
Volleyball at the Summer Universiade